Golden Pal (foaled 23 February 2018) is an American-bred and trained Thoroughbred racehorse. He is currently one of the best turf sprinters in the United States after winning two Breeders' Cup events, the Breeders' Cup Juvenile Turf Sprint in 2020 as a two-year-old and the Breeders' Cup Turf Sprint defeating older horses in 2021.

Background
Golden Pal is a bay horse who was bred in Florida by Randall E. Lowe. He raced as a two-year-old for Ranlo Investments as a homebred. He is sired by Uncle Mo, who was the US Champion Two-Year-Old Colt in 2010. 
Golden Pal's dam is Lady Shipman, a daughter of Midshipman, who won eleven black-type wins, including the Royal North Stakes. In 2015, she set track records at six furlongs at the Ocala Training Center in the OBS Sprint Stakes (1:08.80) and at  furlongs at Saratoga in the Smart N Fancy Stakes (1:00.46) and earned $902,387.

Golden Pal is trained by Wesley A. Ward, one of the leading turf sprint trainers in the US.

Wesley A. Ward broke Golden Pal as a yearling. The colt failed to meet his reserve when bidding stalled at $325,000 at the 2019 Keeneland September Yearling Sale.

After his two-year-old campaign Golden Pal was sold privately to the partnership by Westerberg, Derrick Smith, Mrs. John Magnier and Michael Tabor.

Racing career

2020: Two-year-old season
Golden Pal began breezing and preparing for his career at Turfway Park and to run at Keeneland but the spring meeting at Keeneland was canceled due to COVID-19 pandemic in the United States. Trainer Wesley A. Ward then pointed to Gulfstream Park in Florida where Golden Pal began his career on 17 April in a Maiden Special Weight event starting as the 1/2 odds-on favorite. Out of the starting gate Golden Pal was bumped but surged forward in the short  furlongs event on the dirt to lead but got collared by Gatsby turning for home, and yielded grudgingly on the rail to finish second by  length.

Impressed with his debut, trainer Wesley A. Ward planned for an early overseas trip for the two-year-old to Royal Ascot where he has often been successful with early running two-year-olds and turf sprinters. On 19 June Golden Pal ran in the 5 furlong Group 2 Norfolk Stakes facing eleven opponents. Starting at 12/1 Golden Pal improved his barrier skills and bounced out in front leading down the center of the track but was collared in the final stride by The Lir Jet. After the event Wesley A. Ward indicated that he was considering bringing Golden Pal back to England after a rest in the US in August for the Knavesmire speed test, well known as the Nunthorpe Stakes at York Racecourse.

However, Wesley A. Ward opted to stay in the US with Golden Pal and initially was entered to run on 8 August in the Tyro Stakes at Monmouth Park Racetrack but was scratched since the race was taken off the turf. Two weeks later, on 21 August Wesley A. Ward entered him in the Skidmore Stakes at Saratoga, a Black-type turf event for two-year-olds over  furlongs. Since Golden Pal was still a maiden he received a four pound allowance and with it he bounced out of the gate with blazing speed, leading all the way as the 9/20 odds-on favorite winning by  lengths in a time of 1:00.88 which was about  second outside the track record.

After a 10 week break, in his last start of the year Wesley A. Ward entered Golden Pal in the Grade II Breeders' Cup Juvenile Turf Sprint at Keeneland. Golden Pal drew post position 14, but with the scratching of Wesley A. Ward's other entrant Amanzi Yimpilo (IRE) Golden Pal started from post position 13 as the 4/5 odds-on favorite. He started quickly to lead and was  lengths in front after 2 splits, jockey Irad Ortiz Jr. had to tugged him back. He entered the stretch run 4 lengths in front and running to the wire Golden Pal was able to hold off the fast finishing Cowan by  length. Owner Randell Lowe commented in the winner's circle, "Wesley A. Ward has believed in this horse from day one. I've been telling everyone about this horse. It has been a long haul, but we did it."

2021: Three-year-old season
After the Breeder's Cup it was discovered that Golden Pal had a chip in the front ankle and minor surgery was needed to removed it. After Golden Pal had recovered and started to prepare for his sophomore campaign it was announced in June that Randell Lowe had sold Golden Pal to the Coolmore Stud partnership of Derrick Smith, Mrs. John Magnier and Michael Tabor with Westerberg also having an interest in the horse.

Golden Pal remained with trainer Wesley A. Ward and had his first start of the year on opening day of the annual summer meeting at Saratoga in the Grade III Quick Call Stakes. Golden Pal did not waste time showing his custom speed by setting splits of :21.92 and :44.88, blitzing his rival and cruising across the finish line by a margin of three lengths as the 1/5 odds-on favorite.

It was confirmed in August that Wesley A. Ward would set his sights for another trip to Britain for a crack at the Group 1 Nunthorpe Stakes. Golden Pal left Indianapolis on 12 August after a workout breeze a day before. On 20 August Golden Pal ran in the Nunthorpe Stakes after leading, started to tire in the last 100 yards and was soundly beaten by about 5 length into seventh place.

After returning to the US and regrouping Golden Pal was pointed to the Grade II Woodford Stakes at Keeneland. The event held on the second day of the fall meeting at the Keeneland track (9 October) attracted seven runners. Punters once again had overwhelmingly bet Golden Pal into a 1/2 odds-on favorite with US Hall of Fame jockey John Velazquez aboard he atoned for his defeat at York by trouncing his rivals by  lengths in a time of 1:03.12.

On 6 November Golden Pal returned back to the Breeders' Cup and was entered in the Breeders' Cup Turf Sprint. As the lukewarm 5/2 favorite Golden Pal started brilliantly with former rider Irad Ortiz Jr. and led all the way capture his first Grade I by  lengths in a time of 55.22, which was a  second outside the track record set by Fast Parade in 2006. Wesley A. Ward commented after the event, "He's got the title—he's the best horse (I've ever trained). I hope everyone in horse racing has a horse like this, as special as he is."

2022: Four-year-old season
On 9 April Golden Pal opened his four-year-old campaignwith an easy  length win at Keeneland in the Grade II Shakertown Stakes leading all the way in a time of 1:02.21. The victory was an ideal preparation for another trip to England.

Golden Pal started as the 15/8 favorite in a field of sixteen sprinters in the Group 1 King's Stand Stakes at Royal Ascot over the five furlong straight course on opening day of the meeting and was slow to the gate. When the gates opened Golden Pal missed the start and although jockey Irad Ortiz Jr. rallied the horse after one furlong Golden Pal began to weaken about two furlongs from the finish and was eased down and finished last to Australian champion Nature Strip.

Golden Pal returned back to the US and after a break of six weeks his connections positioned him towards the GIII Troy Stakes at Saratoga. Golden Pal did not go straight to the front but rated outside leader True Valour and jockey Ortiz was confident he would get him and so was trainer Wesley A. Ward. Golden Pal battled with True Valour to the finishing post to win by a head in a time of 1:00.92. "I worked him twice and it was no problem in the morning," Ortiz said. "He relaxed well and finished good, so I wasn't afraid."

Golden Pal was pointed to the Grade II Woodford Stakes at Keeneland, an event he won in the previous year. Golden Pal shot right to the front as the field left the starting gate and showed the way for jockey Irad Ortiz Jr. through fractions of :21.25, :43.42. It did not appear Ortiz was even asking for his best as Golden Pal scored his eighth win from 12 starts by  lengths in a stakes-record time of 1:01.39 on firm turf.

Statistics

Legend:

 
 

Notes:

An (*) asterisk after the odds means Golden Pal was the post-time favourite.

Pedigree

References

2018 racehorse births
Breeders' Cup Juvenile Turf Sprint winners
Breeders' Cup Turf Sprint winners
Racehorses bred in Florida
Thoroughbred family 1-x
American Grade 1 Stakes winners